Ismism is the fourth studio album by English duo Godley & Creme, released in October 1981 by Polydor Records. In the US it was released under the name Snack Attack. It was recorded between April–May 1980 at Lymehouse Studios in Leatherhead, Surrey and engineered and re-mixed at Nigel Gray's Surrey Sound Studios.

Ismism peaked at No. 29 on the UK Albums Chart and at No. 28 on the Dutch Albums Chart, making it their best-selling studio album. Three singles were released from the album: "Under Your Thumb", "Wedding Bells" and "Snack Attack", with the first two singles charting within the Top 10 on the UK Singles Chart.

Ismism was reissued on CD in 2004 under Ismism... Plus name (with other Godley & Creme albums) with singles' B-sides as bonus tracks.

Artwork
The album's cover artwork, designed by Ben Kelly, originally was in white with the title spelt out via holes in the cover which showed a contrasting colour beneath. Later versions used coloured dots instead of holes. An alternative version of the cover featured a black background.

Critical reception

In a retrospective review for AllMusic, critic Mark Allan wrote of the album, "Prone to pretension, these two English Frank Zappas revel in outright silliness on much of this album", adding that "throughout all of this, you get the nagging feeling this pair was capable of so much more."

Track listing

Personnel
Credits are adapted from the Ismism liner notes.

Musicians
 Kevin Godley — vocals; drums; percussion; drum machine
 Lol Creme — vocals; bass; guitar; keyboards; synthesizers
 Bimbo Acock – saxophone

Production and artwork
 Kevin Godley – producer
 Lol Creme – producer; engineer
 Nigel Gray – mixer
 Ben Kelly – artwork

Charts

References

External links
 

1981 albums
Godley & Creme albums
New wave albums by English artists